This is a summary of 1991 in music in the United Kingdom, including the official charts from that year.

Summary
Like 1990, this year saw 17 songs at number 1. The first number 1 of the year surprisingly came from heavy metal band Iron Maiden, scoring their first and only number one "Bring Your Daughter to the Slaughter" which stayed at the top for 2 weeks. The next number one was a track right at the opposite end of the musical spectrum – Enigma, with the calm and hypnotic "Sadness Part 1". Known as "Sadeness Part 1" almost everywhere else with its strong references to Marquis De Sade, Enigma redefined the new age, chill out genre. Romanian-German producer Michael Cretu mixed repeated trance-like dance beats with gregorian chants and whispered, erotic vocals provided by his wife, Sandra, who was also a popular artist in her own right at the same time throughout most of Europe, but never managed to crack the UK market. Enigma's debut concept album MCMXC ad also went straight to the top of the UK Album Chart in January.

In the album charts Simply Red entered with Stars which would prove to be the second best selling album of the 90s and the best of 1991 and 1992. Although none of its singles reached no.1, title track "Stars" did make the top ten.

February saw The Simpsons (specifically Bart) reach No. 1 with "Do the Bartman", from the album The Simpsons Sing the Blues which reached #6. The show had premiered on UK screens on the satellite channel Sky One in 1990, though it wouldn't premiere on terrestrial TV until 1996, on BBC One. The family became the first cartoon characters to hit No. 1 since The Archies did so in 1969, with "Sugar Sugar", and the follow-up ("Deep, Deep Trouble") also did well, peaking at No. 7 in April.

In March, The Clash received their first number 1 with "Should I Stay or Should I Go", after being used in a commercial for Levi's. A month later, Cher scored her first UK solo No. 1 with "The Shoop Shoop Song (It's in His Kiss)", taken from the film Mermaids.

Bryan Adams also reached No. 1 for the first time in July with "(Everything I Do) I Do It for You", from the film Robin Hood: Prince of Thieves. Breaking the record held since 1955, it stayed there for sixteen consecutive weeks, a record that remains to this day. It also became the biggest selling single of the year, selling over a million copies.

The Christmas number one single this year was Queen's "Bohemian Rhapsody", re-issued after the death of Freddie Mercury in November, coupled with "These Are the Days of Our Lives". As "Bohemian Rhapsody" had previously hit the top in 1975 (also becoming the Christmas number one) it became the first song ever, not counting re-entries, to hit number 1 twice.

The death of Joy Finzi, who had founded the Finzi Trust in 1969 to commemorate her husband Gerald, was one of the most notable events on the classical music scene.  Harrison Birtwistle's opera, Gawain, with a libretto by David Harsent, was performed for the first time on 30 May at the Royal Opera House.

Events
14 January – Carter the Unstoppable Sex Machine's single "Bloodsport for All" is released on the day the Gulf War officially starts, and is banned by the BBC due to its lyrics about racism and bullying in the army.
15 January – A new all-star rendition of the John Lennon song "Give Peace a Chance" is released, featuring Yoko Ono, Lenny Kravitz, Peter Gabriel, Alannah Myles, Tom Petty, Bonnie Raitt and many more, billed as "The Peace Choir". The single is rushed to market in response to the imminent Gulf War.
11 February – Massive Attack release their single "Unfinished Sympathy" but have to temporarily shorten their name to "Massive" to avoid a radio ban of the word "attack" during the Gulf War.
15 May – Richey Edwards of Manic Street Preachers carves the words "4 Real" into his arm with a razor blade during an interview with NME journalist Steve Lamacq, after Lamacq questions the band's authenticity. The incident results in Edwards requiring 18 stitches.
28 June – Paul McCartney's classical composition, the Liverpool Oratorio, receives its premiere at the Liverpool Anglican Cathedral.
14 August - Oasis play their first ever gig at the Boardwalk Club in Manchester. Noel Gallagher, who was at the time roadie for Inspiral Carpets, went with them to watch his brother's band play.
27 October – Fruitbat of Carter the Unstoppable Sex Machine rugby tackles presenter Phillip Schofield at the Smash Hits Poll Winners Party after the group performs their single "After the Watershed".
November – The Rolling Stones sign a new contract with Virgin Records.
1 December – George Harrison plays Yokohama, Japan. The brief Japanese tour with Eric Clapton marks his first set of formal concert performances since 1974.

Publications
Moura Lympany (with Margot Strickland) –  Moura – Her Autobiography

Charts

Number-one singles

Number-one albums

Year-end charts

Best-selling singles

Best-selling albums

Classical music
Roy Douglas – Festivities and A Nowell Sequence for strings
Michael Tippett – String Quartet No. 5

Music awards

BRIT Awards
The 1991 BRIT Awards winners were:

Best British producer: Chris Thomas
Best classical recording: José Carreras, Plácido Domingo, Luciano Pavarotti – In Concert
Best soundtrack: Twin Peaks
British album: George Michael – Listen Without Prejudice Vol. 1
British breakthrough act: Betty Boo
British female solo artist: Lisa Stansfield
British group: The Cure
British male solo artist: Elton John
British single: Depeche Mode "Enjoy the Silence"
British video: The Beautiful South "A Little Time"
International breakthrough act: MC Hammer
International female: Sinéad O'Connor
International group: INXS
International male: Michael Hutchence
Outstanding contribution: Status Quo

Births
12 January – Pixie Lott, singer
17 February – Ed Sheeran, singer-songwriter
16 June – Joe McElderry, singer
17 June – Shura, singer, songwriter and producer
30 July – Diana Vickers, singer
11 November – Emma Blackery, singer 
19 December – Declan Galbraith, singer
24 December – Louis Tomlinson, singer (One Direction)

Deaths
8 January – Steve Clark, guitarist (Def Leppard), 30 (alcohol poisoning)
21 February – Margot Fonteyn, ballerina, 71
9 March – Denise Tolkowsky, pianist and composer, 72
24 March – Maudie Edwards, actress and singer, 84
10 April – Martin Hannett (Martin Zero), record producer, 42 (heart failure)
20 April – Steve Marriott, singer, songwriter and guitarist (Small Faces and Humble Pie), 44 (killed in house fire)
8 June – John Vallier, pianist and composer, 70
14 June – Joy Finzi, founder of the Finzi Trust, 84
30 July – Max Jaffa, violinist and bandleader, 79
6 August – Max Rostal, Austrian-born violinist and viola player, 86
25 September – Sydney MacEwan, singer of traditional Scottish and Irish songs, 82
8 November - Dave Rowbotham, musician, guitarist, (The Durutti Column), (The Mothmen), 33 (murdered)
14 November – Bryden Thomson, conductor, 63
24 November – Freddie Mercury, singer and songwriter, 45 (pneumonia brought on by AIDS)
12 December – Ronnie Ross, jazz saxophonist, 58

See also
 1991 in British radio
 1991 in British television
 1991 in the United Kingdom
 List of British films of 1991

References

External links
BBC Radio 1's Chart Show
The Official Charts Company

 
British music
Music
British music by year